Salvatore Iovino (born July 15, 1983) is an American professional stock car racing driver. He is also a team owner for Holleran-Iovino Racing (HIR) in the K&N Pro Series East, competing under the Patriot Motorsports Group banner. Prior to competing in stock car racing, he competed as a NHRA drag racing driver. Iovino is a first-generation driver.

Early life and career
Iovino was born in Phoenix, Arizona and raised in Southern California. In 2008, he moved to Georgia, where he owns the Atlanta-based telecommunications company, Integrated Tower Services LLC. The company performs cell tower maintenance, repair and installation.

Racing career
In 2012, Iovino began his racing career competing in the NHRA, driving Pro Stock, Pro Dial, and Super Pro Street Class drag cars. In early 2016, Iovino began stock car racing, starting with the NASCAR All-Whelen Modified’s, NAPA Latemodel Series. In July 2016, he moved into the NASCAR K&N Pro Series starting his first race at the Stateline Speedway in Idaho. After moving to the K&N series, Iovino completed the 7 races that were left on the schedule. Despite only completing half the season, Iovino won the honors of Most Popular Driver for the NASCAR K&N Pro West Series in November 2016. On February 19, 2017, Iovino finished 17th in his first NASCAR K&N Pro Series East race at New Smyrna.

On March 15, 2017, it was announced that Iovino would drive full-time for Copp Motorsports in the Camping World Truck Series during the 2018 season. The partnership did not work out as family issues derailed him from gaining the permits necessary to compete. Plans on running the full 2018 NASCAR K&N Pro Series East season, with some K&N West and ARCA races being a part of the schedule in 2018, also only resulted in a part-time schedule as he only ran three K&N East races.

Motorsports career results

NASCAR
(key) (Bold – Pole position awarded by qualifying time. Italics – Pole position earned by points standings or practice time. * – Most laps led.)

K&N Pro Series East

K&N Pro Series West

 Season still in progress
 Ineligible for series points

ARCA Racing Series
(key) (Bold – Pole position awarded by qualifying time. Italics – Pole position earned by points standings or practice time. * – Most laps led.)

 Season still in progress
 Ineligible for series points

Legal issues
On November 7, 2019, Salvatore Iovino and his wife Melissa Iovino were arrested in Kennesaw, GA. Charges include two felony counts of unlawfully entering a car with intent to commit a crime, felony cocaine possession, felony possession of hydrocodone to distribute, felony possession of amphetamine to distribute, three counts of felony forgery in the third degree, felony card theft, and felony identity theft. Salvatore was released, on bond, on December 28, 2019. He is currently awaiting trial.  The storage facility, the site of many of the crimes, has since sold at auction the storage locker containing most of the Iovino's belongings, which have been sold by the buyer.

References

External links
 

Living people
NASCAR drivers
1983 births
Racing drivers from Phoenix, Arizona